Naticarius stercusmuscarum, the Fly-specked Moon Snail, is a species of predatory sea snail, a marine gastropod mollusk in the family Naticidae, the moon snails.

Description
The shell surface is yellow or color cream with dense, small, red-brown dots. The mantle and the foot of this mollusk are brownish dotted with bright spots. It has a well-developed foot with the two cephalic visible appendages.

Distribution and habitat
This quite common species can be found in the Mediterranean sea and in North Western Africa. It lives mostly on sandy and muddy seabeds but it can also be found on rocky bottoms.

Fossils of this species can be found in sediment of Italy and Greece from Pleistocene to recent.

References

 Gofas, S.; Le Renard, J.; Bouchet, P. (2001). Mollusca, in: Costello, M.J. et al. (Ed.) (2001). European register of marine species: a check-list of the marine species in Europe and a bibliography of guides to their identification. Collection Patrimoines Naturels, 50: pp. 180–213
 Huelsken T., Marek K., Schreiber S., Schmidt I. & Hollmann M. (2008). The Naticidae (Mollusca: Gastropoda) of Giglio Island (Tuscany, Italy): Shell characters, live animals, and a molecular analysis of egg masses. Zootaxa 1770: 1-40

External links
 Natura Mediterraneo

Naticidae
Gastropods described in 1791